Mount Murchison is a rural locality in the Shire of Banana, Queensland, Australia.

Geography
Callide Power Station is in the south-east of the locality at 1092 Biloela Callide Road.

History

Mount Murchison State School opened on 24 April 1935. The new school was built to cater for up to 24 students with a single 18x18 foot classroom with 8 foot verandas front and rear; it was a timber building with a galvanised iron roof and was built on the property of Mr C. G. Skinner. The teacher was Reg Davidson.

Callide Power Station commenced operation in 1965. It was officially opened by Queensland Premier Frank Nicklin  on 21 August 1965. 

The mobile library service commenced in 2004.

In the 2011 census, Mount Murchison had a population of 226 people.

In the  Mount Murchison had a population of 149 people.

On 25 May 2021, an explosion and subsequent fire at Callide Power Station caused a significant power outage that affected over 375,000 premises.

Economy 
Callide Power Station is an coal-powered electricity generator  with eight steam turbines with a combined generation capacity of 1,720 megawatts (MW) of electricity. As of 2018, generation capacity was 1510 MW.

Education
Mount Murchison State School is a government primary (Prep-6) school for boys and girls at Lot 137 Dawson Highway. In 2013, the school had 16 students in a single multi-age class with one teacher. In 2018, the school had an enrolment of 33 students with 3 teachers and 6 non-teaching staff (2 full-time equivalent).

There is no secondary school in Mount Murchison. The nearest secondary school is Biloela State High School in Biloela to the south-west.

Amenities 
Banana Shire Council operate  a fortnightly mobile library service to the school.

Biloela Dirt Riders operate the Stoneyridge Raceway on Cocups Road.

References

Further reading 

 

Shire of Banana
Localities in Queensland